The National Institute of Pharmaceutical Education and Research, Hyderabad (NIPER Hyderabad) is an Indian public pharmaceutical research university. It is one of the seven schools under India's Ministry of Chemicals and Fertilizers. The institute offers Masters and Doctoral degrees in pharmaceutical sciences. As an Institute of National Importance, it plays a major role in human resource development for the Indian pharmaceutical industry.

The institute is located at the former R&D Center of IDPL, Bala Nagar and Hyderabad. Counseling for these institutes are held at NIPER, SAS Nagar (Mohali), Punjab.

The institute has also taken an appreciable initiative to promote the excellence in developing the medical devices by collaborating with AMTZ vizag.

Ranking

In 2022 the National Institutional Ranking Framework (NIRF) ranked Hyderabad 2nd in pharmaceutical studies.

Courses

NIPER Hyderabad offers courses in:
 Pharmaceutical Management, M.B.A. (Pharmacy)
 Medicinal Chemistry, M.S. (Pharmacy)
 Pharmacology & Toxicology, M.S. (Pharmacy)
 Pharmaceutical Analysis, M.S. (Pharmacy)
 Pharmaceutics, M.S. (Pharmacy)
 Regulatory Toxicology, M.S.
 Process Tech & Process Chem., M.Tech.
 Medical Devices, M.Tech

32 Ph.D. students were conducting research work in NIPER-Hyderabad.

NIPER-Hyderabad started an MBA Pharmacy in 2012..

See also 

 Genome Valley
NIPER Hyderabad collaborates with AMTZ for conducting Course M.Tech. (Medical Devices)

References

National Institute of Pharmaceutical Education and Research
Pharmacy schools in India
Research institutes in Hyderabad, India
Universities and colleges in Hyderabad, India
Pharmaceutical industry of India
1998 establishments in Andhra Pradesh
Educational institutions established in 1998
Educational institutions in India with year of establishment missing